Carrefour City is French a chain of proximity convenience stores created in 2009 by the Carrefour Group with locations in four countries, France, Belgium, Spain and UAE.

Carrefour City stores are convenience stores in city centers, all of these stores are open six days a week.

History 
In January 2009, the first City stores opened in Paris, Nîmes and Avignon.

At the end of 2009, the Carrefour group decided to transform about 50 Shopi (also owned by Carrefour) proximity supermarkets into Carrefour City, the Shopi chain could eventually be replaced completely.

In December 2010, Carrefour announced two new proximity store concepts in France, Carrefour Express and Carrefour City Café, the latter being a Carrefour City store with an in-house café.

Carrefour City have also expanded to Spain with currently 11 stores in Madrid only.

In March 2020, Carrefour unveiled Mobimart, UAE's first grocery bus. This concept aims to bring fresh food and supplies to under-serviced neighborhoods across the region.

Carrefour City Café
Carrefour City Café was an experimental urban convenience store format that offers hot beverages and food items for consumption on the spot or take away. Over 700 takeaway items (snacks, sandwiches, cold drinks, bread and pastries, etc.) were to be available for city dwellers in the 100 to 150m² stores. The first Carrefour City Café opened in Bordeaux on December 16, 2010 before a second unit followed in early 2011. After nearly two years of market testing, the café format was abandoned.

See also
 Carrefour

References

Carrefour
Supermarkets of France
Supermarkets of Spain
Retail companies established in 2009